Rivière des Pins (English: River of the Pines) may refer to:

Rivière des Pins (Blanc Lake), a tributary of Lac Blanc, in MRC Mékinac Regional County Municipality and Portneuf Regional County Municipality, in Quebec, Canada
Rivière des Pins (Nicolet River tributary), a tributary of the Nicolet River flowing in MRC Arthabaska, Centre-du-Québec, in Quebec, in Canada

See also
Rivière aux Pins (disambiguation)
Pine River (disambiguation)